The  1944 German football championship, the 37th edition of the competition, was won by Dresdner SC, the club defending its 1943 title by defeating Luftwaffe team LSV Hamburg in the final.

The final years of the German Championship during the war saw many military teams compete in the championship, Luftwaffe teams, Luftwaffensportvereine, short LSV, and, Wehrmacht teams, Wehrmachtssportvereine, short WSV, became very competitive.

Dresden's Helmut Schön, who would later coach Germany to the 1974 FIFA World Cup, became the top scorer of the 1944 championship with 14 goals, the second-highest individual amount of any player in the history of the competition from 1903 to 1963.

It was the last edition of the tournament during the Second World War, with the competition not being held again until 1948. The thirty-one 1943–44 Gauliga champions, two more than in the previous season, competed in a single-leg knock out competition to determine the national champion.

Dresdner SC became the last club to be awarded the Viktoria, the annual trophy for the German champions from 1903 to 1944. The trophy disappeared during the final stages of the war, did not resurface until after the German reunification and was put on display at the DFB headquarters in Frankfurt until 2015, when it was moved to the new Deutsches Fußballmuseum in Dortmund.

Qualified teams
The teams qualified through the 1943–44 Gauliga season:

Competition

First round
Borussia Fulda received a bye for the first round.

|align="center" style="background:#ddffdd" colspan=3|16 April 1944

|}

Replay

|align="center" style="background:#ddffdd" colspan=3|23 April 1944

|}

Round of 16

|align="center" style="background:#ddffdd" colspan=3|7 May 1944

|}

Replay

|align="center" style="background:#ddffdd" colspan=3|14 May 1944

|}

Quarter-finals

|align="center" style="background:#ddffdd" colspan=3|21 May 1944

|}

Semi-finals

Third place play-off

Final

References

Sources
 kicker Allmanach 1990, by kicker, page 164 & 177 - German championship

External links
 German Championship 1943–44 at weltfussball.de 
 German Championship 1944 at RSSSF

1
German
German football championship seasons